The 2011 UCI Mountain Bike World Cup included three disciplines: cross-country, downhill and four-cross.

Cross-country

Downhill

Four-Cross

See also
2011 UCI Mountain Bike & Trials World Championships

External links
 Homepage
 DHI3 Leogang results
 DHI4 MSA men results
 DHI4 MSA women results
 DHI5 Windham men results
 DHI5 Windham women results
 DHI6 La Bresse men & women results
 DHI7 Val di Sole men results
 DHI7 Val di Sole women results

UCI Mountain Bike World Cup
Mountain Bike World Cup